Brighter Horizons Academy (BHA) is a full-time accredited pre-k through 12 Islamic college preparatory in Garland, Texas, USA. It is one of the first Islamic schools to offer a dual-credit program in conjunction with Dallas County Community College District to allow students to graduate high school with an associate's degree.

History
The School was founded in 1989 by Islamic Services Foundation in response to parental demand for an Islamic academic environment in North Texas. The first building was a 2,000 sq.ft. residential property purchased in 1990, located on Polk street. The first graduating class in 2002 consisted of 6 students who earned a total of $47,000 in college scholarships.

BHA was founded on the principles of providing quality education in an Islamic environment in order to produce well-rounded, competent Muslim leaders.

The current campus property was purchased in 1993 for $396,000. Phase I of the two-story main building was completed in 1999, costing $2.65 million and consisting of a 28,000 sq ft building and playground. In 2003 an adjacent medical office building was purchased to be used for the Early Childhood Education building.

Brighter Horizons Academy today

BHA received accreditation from Southern Association of Colleges and Schools (SACS) CASI in 2006. SACS CASI uses five standards when accrediting a school, which are purpose and direction, governance and leadership, teaching and assessing for learning, resources and support systems, and using results for continuous improvement.

The school colors are blue and gold, and the current school uniform consists of a combination of light blue or khaki tops, and grey or navy slacks,  All clothing adheres to Islamic standards of dress. Girls are required to wear a head scarf starting in 5th grade.

The school logo is an open Qur'an with the word Iqra ("Read"). This was the first word of the Qur'an revealed to the Prophet Muhammad by the Angel Gabriel. Students are taught to apply Islamic studies to other areas of academics and their lives beyond school.

The academies mascot is a star. The academy is also known as BHA Stars. BHA takes great pride in being the Home of the Stars!!

Academics
BHA has a dual-credit program with Richland College. Juniors and Seniors may take college courses at the BHA campus.

The faculty consists of 100 full-time teachers and staff. The school has introduced a laptop program in which all students enrolled in 11th grade receive a laptop.

BHA offers five graduation programs
Advanced - Must complete 4 credits each of English, Math, Science, Arabic, electives, and 5 credits of social studies; no minimum requirement for GPA, volunteer hours, or SAT.
Distinguished - Must complete 4 credits each of English, Math, Science, Arabic, electives, and 5 credits of social studies; minimum grade average of 85, 20 volunteer hours per year, minimum SAT/ACT 1500/21.
Distinguished with completion DCCCD core - Must complete 4 credits each of English, Math, Science, Arabic, electives, and 5 credits of social studies; minimum grade average of 93, 20 volunteer hours per year, minimum SAT/ACT 1500/21.
Distinguished with completion of associate degree - Must complete 4 credits each of English, Math, Science, Arabic, electives, and 5 credits of social studies; minimum grade average of 95, 20 volunteer hours per year, minimum SAT/ACT 1500/21.
Accelerated - Must meet all requirements of the Distinguished program with the exception of fourth year Arabic/Islamic studies. Student graduates one year early. Mona Shaito graduated from BHA with the Accelerated degree option in order to compete in the 2012 Olympic games in London in foil along with her brother Zain Shaito.

In addition to academics, BHA offers an Islamic Studies and Hifz program. The Hifz program is offered both full-time and after school and is separate from the Islamic Studies courses offered as standard curriculum.

Tuition
The tuition is $7416.00 per academic year with financial aid offered to those who demonstrate need. Islamic Services Foundation provides an average of $180,000 in financial aid.

Clubs and organizations

BHA competes in Private Schools Interscholastic Association competitions each year.

Recognizing the need to cater to the individual interests of each student, BHA has, over the years, incorporated extracurricular clubs and events into campus life. Some of the clubs offered at BHA include an award-winning yearbook and journalism club, art and drama, Scripps National Spelling Bee, and Doodle4Google. In 2014, BHA student Aaliya Jaleel won the state Doodle competition.

In 2002, BHA parent Omar Syed and 2012 salutatorian BHA graduate Aamir Syed created the strategic game Arimaa, a nationally recognized game of strategy similar to chess but easier to learn. Omar Syed instructs the after-school Arimaa club at BHA.

References

External links
 Brighter Horizons Academy website

1989 establishments in Texas
Schools in Garland, Texas
High schools in Garland, Texas
Educational institutions established in 1989
Islamic schools in Texas
Private K-12 schools in Dallas County, Texas
Islamic organizations established in 1989